Sher Singh can refer to:
 Maharaja Sher Singh (1807-1843), Sikh ruler of the Punjab and the Sikh Empire
 Sher Singh Attariwalla, military commander of the Sikh Empire in the mid-19th century in Punjab
 T. Sher Singh (born 1949), Canadian lawyer
 Sher Singh Ghubaya (born 1962), Indian politician, member of the Lok Sabha
 Sher Singh Rana (21st century), Indian convicted assassin
Sher Singh (2019 film), Bhojpuri language film starred by Pawan Singh and Amrapali Dubey.